Giovanni Deterville (born 30 June 1981), is a St. Lucian professional football player who currently plays for the St. Lucian national team. He debuted in 2008 during the 2010 FIFA World Cup qualification campaign, with a 2–0 victory against Turks and Caicos Islands.

He also appeared at the qualification in the 2018 FIFA World Cup in Russia.

On 7 September 2018, he was last seen in a match of the qualifiers on the CONCACAF Nations League, against Antigua and Barbuda resulting 0–3 victory.

References

1981 births
Living people
Saint Lucia international footballers
Association football goalkeepers
Saint Lucian footballers